Honestie Hodges (November 9, 2006 – November 22, 2020) was an American teenager from Grand Rapids, Michigan.

Handcuffing incident
On December 6, 2017, at the age of 11, Honestie Hodges was handcuffed at gunpoint by the Grand Rapids Police Department while the police were searching for a suspect in a reported crime. The body cam footage of her arrest gained U.S. nationwide coverage and led to the Grand Rapids Police Department enacting a Youth Interactions Policy, nicknamed the "Honestie Policy", in March 2018. The policy called for using minimally restrictive disciplinary and law-enforcement methods when interacting with children and youth.

In July 2022, the Michigan Department of Civil Rights announced racial discrimination charges were filed against the Grand Rapids Police Department for the handcuffing of Hodges's in her 2017 arrest.

Personal life
Hodges contracted COVID-19 on November 9, 2020, her 14th birthday, during the COVID-19 pandemic in Michigan. She died from the virus thirteen days later on November 22.

References  

2006 births
2020 deaths
Deaths from the COVID-19 pandemic in Michigan
African-American people
People from Grand Rapids, Michigan
Law enforcement in Michigan